Minuscule 587 (in the Gregory-Aland numbering), ε 229 (von Soden), is a Greek minuscule manuscript of the New Testament, on parchment. Palaeographically it has been assigned to the 12th century. The manuscript has complex contents. It was labeled by Scrivener as 456.

Description 

The codex contains a complete text of the four Gospels on 183 parchment leaves (size ) with only one lacuna (Matthew 1:1-20). The text is written in one column per page, 25-27 lines per page, initial letters in silver. It is beautifully written.

The last leaf of the codex, contains text of John 21:8-25, was supplemented in the 15th century.

Text 

The Greek text of the codex is a representative of the Byzantine text-type. Hermann von Soden classified it as a member of the textual family Kx. Aland placed it in Category V.
According to the Wisse's Profile Method it represents the textual family Kx in Luke 1 and Luke 20. In Luke 10 no profile was made.

History 

The manuscript was added to the List of New Testament manuscripts by F. H. A. Scrivener.

The manuscript currently is housed at the Biblioteca Ambrosiana (M. 48 sup.), at Milan.

See also 

 List of New Testament minuscules
 Biblical manuscript
 Textual criticism

References

Further reading 

 

Greek New Testament minuscules
12th-century biblical manuscripts